Paul Hurault, 8th Marquis de Vibraye (1809–1878) was an amateur archaeologist from France.

He was born Guillaume-Paul Louis Maximilien Hurault, son of a notable politician and military officer .

He discovered the very first Paleolithic sculptural representation of a woman discovered in modern times. It was found in about 1864 by at the famous archaeological site of Laugerie-Basse in the Vézère valley (one of the many important Stone Age sites in and around the commune of Les Eyzies-de-Tayac-Sireuil in Dordogne, southwestern France). The Magdalenian "Venus" from Laugerie-Basse is headless, footless, armless but with a strongly incised vaginal opening. De Vibraye named it La Vénus impudique or Venus Impudica ("immodest Venus"), contrasting it to the Venus Pudica, Hellenistic sculpture by Praxiteles showing Aphrodite covering her naked pubis with her right hand. It is from this name that we get the term "Venus figurines" commonly used for Stone Age sculptures of this kind.

References

1809 births
1878 deaths
French archaeologists